Christian Brothers College may refer to:

Africa
 Christian Brothers College, Bulawayo, Zimbabwe
 Christian Brothers' College, Boksburg, in Gauteng, South Africa
 Christian Brothers' College, Mount Edmund, in Pretoria, South Africa

Australia
 Christian Brothers College, Adelaide, South Australia 
 Christian Brothers College, Burwood, in Sydney, New South Wales, Australia
 Christian Brothers College, Fremantle, in Perth, Western Australia
 Christian Brothers' College, Maryborough, Queensland, Australia
 Christian Brothers' College, Perth, Western Australia
 Christian Brothers College, Rose Bay, New South Wales, Australia
 Christian Brothers College, St Kilda, Victoria, Australia

Ireland
 Christian Brothers College Charleville, County Cork, Ireland
 Christian Brothers College, Cork, Ireland
 Christian Brothers College, Monkstown Park, in Dún Laoghaire, County Cork, Ireland

U.S.
 Christian Brothers College High School, in St. Louis, Missouri
 Christian Brothers College, former name of Christian Brothers University, in Memphis, Tennessee
 Christian Brothers College, predecessor of Christian Brothers University in Pass Christian, Mississippi

See also 
 Christian Brothers Academy (disambiguation)
 List of Christian Brothers schools